NightCaster II: Equinox is a third-person, action role-playing game (RPG) for the Xbox, that was developed by Team Schadenfreude and published by Jaleco. It is the direct sequel to NightCaster.

Gameplay
NightCaster II features a unique dual analog control system that lets a player maneuver their character in one direction while accurately aiming spells in another direction. It also features two-player cooperative gameplay where players can battle armies of enemies, made up of 35 different creatures, using melee attacks and more than 32 spells from four elementally opposed schools of magic: Fire & Water, and Dark & Light.

Reception

NightCaster II: Equinox received "generally unfavorable reviews" according to the review aggregation website Metacritic. Matthew Gallant of GameSpot called it "a big step backward for the series in just about every respect."

References

External links

2002 video games
Action role-playing video games
Fantasy video games
Jaleco games
Multiplayer and single-player video games
Role-playing video games
Video game sequels
Video games developed in the United States
Xbox games
Xbox-only games